Fredlanea is a genus of longhorn beetles of the subfamily Lamiinae, containing the following species:

 Fredlanea aequatoria (Bates, 1881)
 Fredlanea calliste (Bates, 1881)
 Fredlanea colombiana (Lane, 1966)
 Fredlanea consobrina (Lane, 1970)
 Fredlanea cymatilis (Lane, 1966)
 Fredlanea flavipennis (Lane, 1966)
 Fredlanea guaranitica (Lane, 1966)
 Fredlanea hiekei (Fuchs, 1970)
 Fredlanea hovorei Galileo & Martins, 2005
 Fredlanea kirschi (Aurivillius, 1923)
 Fredlanea maculata Martins & Galileo, 1996
 Fredlanea putiapitanga Galileo & Martins, 1999
 Fredlanea velutina (Lane, 1966)
 Fredlanea vilhena Martins & Galileo, 1997
 Fredlanea virginea (Fabricius, 1801)
 Fredlanea viridipennis (Bates, 1885)

References

Hemilophini